Baseball at the 1956 Summer Olympics was a demonstration sport at the 1956 Summer Olympics in Melbourne.  Though it was nominally the "foreign" demonstration sport of that Olympiad, Australia had a long history of baseball dating back to at least 1889.  The Australians were the first to field a full team in an exhibition match against the United States, represented by a detachment from the United States Far East Command. Many Sheffield Shield cricket players – who were quite successful at baseball as a winter sport – were unable to be selected on the basis that they were professional players.

Game
The game was played on 1 December 1956 from 12:30p.m. at the Melbourne Cricket Ground. Due to the field being set up between the running tracks, right field was only , so special ground rules were put in place, stating that a ball hit over the running track on the full will be declared a home run, where one that bounces (or rolls) on or over the track shall be declared a ground rule double. This rule was put in place to stop baseball cleats damaging the track for the events after the baseball.

As the visiting team, the Americans batted first, scoring two runs off three hits. Australia did not strike back until the bottom of the second inning, when Chalky White of South Australia hit a solo home run off Vane Sutton. Sutton made up for his error in the top half on the third inning, with a grand slam to send the score out to a commanding 6–1. The Americans again put the pressure on Australia in the fifth inning as two errors led to another two runs to the US, putting them in a comfortable position.

The game was eventually called at 2:40p.m., after six completed innings and a final score of 11–5, with the Americans batting first. Very few fans were present at the start of the game, but over 100,000 had arrived by the sixth inning. This was due to the finals for the 1500 metres, 4 × 400 metres relay, and finish of the men's marathon.

Game score

Umpire: Gunnah Mollah

Rosters

United States
 Leonard Weissinger (Manager)
 Walter Koziatek
 Vane Sutton
 Angelo Barro
 Anthony Denicole
 Joe Belak
 Joseph Poglajen
 Garethe Methvin
 Rudolph Martinez
 John Clement
 Ken Cochran
 Ken Lowe
 Floyd Lasser
 Alvin Pfeffer
 John Riley
 George Zucca
 Tom Black
 Jesse Finch
 Richard Griesser
 Bruce Holt
 Ben Dolson

Australia
 Reg Darling (Manager)
 Eddie Moule
 Peter Box
 Robert Teasdale
 Max Lord
 Barry Wappett
 Colin Payne
 Ken Smith
 Max Puckett
 Neil Turl
 Norman Tyshing
 Ken Morrison
 Norman White
 Peter McDade
 John Langley
 Neville Pratt
 Ross Straw
 Trevor Cooke

See also
 1956 Claxton Shield
 Australian football at the 1956 Summer Olympics

Sources
 
 Official Report. XVI Olympiad Melbourne 1956.

References

 
1956 Summer Olympics events
1956
1956 in baseball
1956
Olympic demonstration sports